The Ghighiu is a right tributary of the river Sărata in Romania. It discharges into the Sărata near Jilavele. It flows through the towns and villages Gura Vadului, Mizil, Baba Ana, Gradiștea and Boldești.

References

Rivers of Romania
Rivers of Prahova County
Rivers of Ialomița County